Rashim Padayachy (born 3 February 1994) is a Seychellois football midfielder who plays for Red Star FC. He was a squad member for the 2015, 2017, 2018 and 2019 COSAFA Cups and the 2019 Indian Ocean Island Games.

References 

1994 births
Living people
Seychellois footballers
The Lions FC players
Red Star FC (Seychelles) players
Seychelles international footballers
Association football midfielders